Qiu Chuji (10 February 1148– 21 August 1227), courtesy name Tongmi (通密), also known by his Taoist name Master Changchun, was the disciple of Wang Chongyang and a renowned Taoist master. He is known for meeting Genghis Khan near the Hindu Kush.

Qiu was one of the Seven True Daoists of the North. He was the founder of the Dragon Gate sect of Taoism attracting a following in the streams of traditions flowing from the sects of the disciples.

History
In 1219 Genghis Khan invited Changchun to visit him in a letter dated 15 May 1219 by present reckoning. Changchun left his home in Shandong in February 1220 and journeyed to Beijing. Learning that Genghis had gone West, he spent winter there. In February 1221, Changchun left, traversing modern-day eastern Mongolia to the camp of Genghis' youngest brother Otchigin near Lake Buyur in the upper Kerulen - today's Kherlen-Amur basin. From there he traveled southwestward up the Kerulen, crossing the Karakorum region in north-central Mongolia, and arrived at the Altai Mountains, probably passing near the present Uliastai. After traversing the Altai he visited Bishbalig, modern Ürümqi, and moved along the north side of the Tian Shan range to Lake Sutkol, today's Sairam, Almaliq (or Yining City), and the rich valley of the Ili.

From there, Changchun passed to Balasagun and Shu River, and across that river to Talas and the Tashkent region, and then over the Syr Darya to Samarkand, where he halted for some months. Finally, through the Iron Gates of Termit, over the Amu Darya, and by way of Balkh and northern Afghanistan, Changchun reached Genghis' camp near the Hindu Kush.

Changchun, had been invited to satisfy the interest of Genghis Khan in "the philosopher's stone" and the secret medicine of immortality. He explained the Taoist philosophy and the many ways to prolong life and was honest in saying there was no secret medicine of immortality. The two had 12 in-depth conversations.  Genghis Khan honoured him with the title Spirit Immortal. Genghis also made Changchun in charge of all religious persons in the empire. Their conversations were recorded in the book Xuanfeng qinghui lu.

The Yenisei area had a community of weavers of ethnic Han origin. Similarly, Samarkand and Outer Mongolia both had artisans of Han origin, as observed by Changchun. After the Mongol conquest of Central Asia, foreigners were chosen as administrators. Co-management with Han and Khitans of gardens and fields in Samarqand was enacted as a requirement since Muslims were not allowed to manage without them.

Returning home, Changchun largely followed his outward route, with certain deviations, such as a visit to Hohhot. He was back in Beijing by the end of January 1224. From the narrative of his expedition, Travels to the West of Qiu Chang Chun written by his pupil Li Zhichang, we derive some of the most vivid pictures ever drawn of nature and man between the Great Wall of China and Kabul, between the Aral and Yellow Seas.

Of particular interest are the sketches of the Mongols and the people of Samarkand and its vicinity, the account of the land and products of Samarkand in the Ili Valley at or near Almalig-Kulja, and the description of various great mountain ranges, peaks and defiles, such as the Chinese Altay, the Tian Shan, Bogdo Uula, and the Iron Gates of Termit. There is, moreover, a noteworthy reference to a land apparently identical with the uppermost valley of the Yenisei.

After his return, Changchun lived in Beijing until his death on 23 July 1227. By order of Genghis Khan, some of the former imperial garden grounds were given to him for the foundation of a Taoist Monastery of the White Clouds that exists to this day.

Fiction
Qiu Chuji appears as a character in Jin Yong's Legend of the Condor Heroes, Return of the Condor Heroes, and the 2013 film An End to Killing. In Jin Yong's work he is very different from the real persona, described as a 'bullheaded priest' who gets into fights and contests with rivals, very contrary to what his religion preaches. His deeds shape much of the future of the 2 main male characters of the first story.

Qiu Chuji appears as a main character in Guo Yulong's 2018 film Zang Sanfeng: Peerless Hero.

Estonian writer Arvo Valton wrote the novel Journey to the Other Side of Infinity (Tee lõpmatuse teise otsa, 1978) about Qiu Chuji's journey to meet Genghis Khan and their subsequent encounters.

References

Citations

Sources 

 E. Bretschneider, Mediaeval Researches from Eastern Asiatic Sources, vol. i. pp. 35–108, where a complete translation of the narrative is given, with a valuable commentary
 C. R. Beazley Dawn of Modern Geography, iii.539.

External links
 Introduction to Quanzhen Daoism and the Dragon Gate Tradition
 The Travels of Ch'ang Ch'un to the West, 1220-1223, recorded by his disciple Li Chi Ch'ang, translated by E. Bretschneider (includes a translation of Genghis Khan's letter of invitation)
 Qiuchuji's story including timeline and comics - but only the Chinese section works
 The Perfect Man of Eternal Spring Qiu Chuji (In Chinese.)

1148 births
1227 deaths
13th-century explorers
Song dynasty Taoists
Yuan dynasty Taoists
Taoist religious leaders